Wolverhampton St George's tram stop is a tram stop in Wolverhampton, England. It was opened on 31 May 1999 and is the current terminus of the West Midlands Metro Line 1. The stop is located on Bilston Street. It is one of two stops on the Wolverhampton end of the Metro (along with The Royal) that are not on the former railway track bed.

The stop was built as a single island platform with two platform faces, with a crossover just outside the stop, though in 2015, the northern track was removed, leaving just the southern platform in use by trams.

The trackbed of the northern line at the Metro stop was converted into a coach drop-off point but saw little use.  It's now used by Banga Bus as the terminus for their 530 and 545 services, replacing  stops in nearby Tower Street.

A branch running from St. George's to the nearby bus and rail stations is expected to open in 2021, with plans to add a loop through Market Street and Lichfield Street at a later date.

Services
Mondays to Fridays, Midland Metro services in each direction between Birmingham and Wolverhampton run at six to eight-minute intervals during the day, and at fifteen-minute intervals during the evenings and on Sundays. They run at eight-minute intervals on Saturdays.

Following the opening of the route to Wolverhampton railway station in 2021, the frequency of services at this stop will be reduced to between two and four trams per hour.

Future
It is unsure whether St Georges will remain open once the Wolverhampton Interchange extension occurs, as it is believed that most Line 1 trams will use the line and St Georges will be served by a complementary service every 15-30 minutes, however this may change when Line 3 opens in 2022-2023. It is believed that St Georges may close and both lines will serve Wolverhampton Interchange.

External links

  Article on this Metro stop from Rail Around Birmingham & the West Midlands
 Article about this stop from thetrams.co.uk

References

Transport in Wolverhampton
West Midlands Metro stops
Railway stations in Great Britain opened in 1999